The Finzi Detective Agency is a 1979 Italian crime-comedy film written and directed by  Bruno Corbucci and starring Renato Pozzetto. It is loosely based on the comic character Riccardo Finzi created by Max Bunker.

Plot 
Riccardo Finzi is a private investigator who moves to Milan in search of fortune. On his first night in town he meets a mysterious girl named Susy, who is later found dead. Convinced of foul play, he and his assistant Giuseppe decide to investigate.

In pop culture 
Investigator Riccardo Finzi, a supporter of football club A.C. Monza, declared in a sentence: "I support Monza, we will never be able to reach the Serie A". The quote became a classic in Monza culture, and was made part of a fan chant: "Il nostro Calcio Monza è in C1, e non andremo mai in Serie A. Ma io non mollerò, questa è la mia mentalità. segui anche tu la squadra della tua città" (Our Calcio Monza is in [Serie] C1, and we will never go to Serie A. But I will not give up, this is my mentality. You too follow the team of your city).

Cast  
Renato Pozzetto as Riccardo Finzi
 Simona Mariani as Samantha
Enzo Cannavale as  Giuseppe aka Ciammarica
Olga Karlatos as Clara Moser
Silvano Tranquilli as  Augusto Moser
Elio Zamuto as Commissioner Salimbeni
 Massimo Belli  as  Pellegrini
Lory Del Santo as  Pierpaola Moser
Luca Sportelli as Doorman
 Barbara De Bortoli as  Arista 
Adriana Facchetti as Pina Parenti
Franco Caracciolo as Moser's Butler

See also   
 List of Italian films of 1979

References

External links

1970s crime comedy films
Films directed by Bruno Corbucci
Films scored by Guido & Maurizio De Angelis
Italian crime comedy films
Italian detective films
Films based on Italian novels
1979 comedy films
1979 films
1970s Italian films
1970s Italian-language films